John J. Knox was a major in the U.S. Army during the American Civil War and a leading figure in the Freedmen's Bureau. Knox Institute was named for him. Monroe Morton attended the Knox Institute and became a messenger for Major Knox.

Johnston was seriously injured during the Civil War and suffered from severe dysentery afterwards.

The University of Georgia library has a collection of papers relating to Knox and the Freedmen's Bureau's activities.

References

Union Army officers
Freedmen's Bureau